Mihailo Ivanović (Kuči 1874 – Herceg Novi 1949) was a Montenegrin politician in the early 20th century. He was one of the leaders of the People's Party (known as klubaši) from 1906 to 1918. After unification, he was disappointed and had become an important leader of the Montenegrin Federalist Party in the assembly of the Kingdom of Serbs, Croats and Slovenes, and an Axis power collaborator

Biography
During his studied in Belgrade in 1899 he was deported from Serbia with a group of Montenegrins on the grounds that they had prepared a terrorist act. He graduated from the Faculty of Law at the University of Zagreb and returned to Montenegro where he worked in the court in Nikšić. Later he became a member of the High Court in the Kingdom of Montenegro.

Ivanović became a believer in Montenegrin unity with Serbia and in 1912 moved to Belgrade. He stayed there until king Nicholas I amnestied him and he returned once more to Montenegro. After the Podgorica Assembly he became a member of the Montenegrin Federalist Party. He was elected to the National Assembly in 1923, 1925, and 1927.

With the establishment of an independent Montenegro during World War II under the patronage of Italy, he participated in the St. Peter's Day Parliament which was to announce a new Montenegrin government. After the war, he lost his citizen's rights under the communist regime for having worked with the Italians.

References

1874 births
1949 deaths
Montenegrin Federalist Party politicians
Montenegrin collaborators with Nazi Germany
Montenegrin people of World War II
Representatives in the Yugoslav National Assembly (1921–1941)
World War II political leaders
Montenegrin nationalists